Vatnvatnet (literal translation water water) is a lake that lies in the municipality of Bodø in Nordland county, Norway. The lake Heggmovatnet flows out into this lake.

See also
 List of lakes in Norway
 Geography of Norway

References

Lakes of Nordland
Bodø